Dellner Couplers AB is a Swedish original equipment manufacturer of train connection systems as couplers, gangway systems and dampers. The headquarter of the company is located in Vika in the Falun Municipality. Dellner is owned by the investment organisation EQT Partners and has 22 subsidiaries worldwide with more than 1,200 employees.

History
Dellner was founded in 1941 by the Swedish engineer Jan Dellner. The first customer was Swedish State Railways, for whom the Engineering Bureau Dellner produced automatic couplers. In the following years, the company, based in the small town of Vika in central Sweden, expanded its business and supplied automatic couplers to numerous customers in Europe, such as the Warsaw Metro, Paris Metro, SNCF, Rome Metro and Italian State Railways. From 1982 onwards, train couplers were also supplied to countries outside Europe. At that time Dellner had a total of 80 employees in Sweden, the US and Canada.

From 1984 Dellner was the first manufacturer to build a gas-hydraulic damper, which was integrated into the draft gear of couplers. This was followed in 1997 by the production of snow gaiters and front hatch mechanisms. In 2003 Dellner introduced a new crash concept for couplers with multiple-stage deformation tubes, followed in 2008 by a high-speed data transmission system for automatic couplers.

Dellner's coupling business has traded under various names over the years. In 1952, the Engineering Bureau Dellner was renamed Runnvika Mechanical Workshop, later the coupling business traded under the names Jan Dellner & Co, AB Dellner Malmco and finally as Dellner Couplers AB. Dellner Couplers AB became a subsidiary of Dellner Invest, which was founded in 1992.

Diversification, growth and restructuring 
In 2009, Dellner acquired the British gangway systems manufacturer Woodville. With this step, the company manifested its expansion from a manufacturer of coupling systems and related products to a manufacturer of train connection systems, covering the entire range of products to connect passenger trains. At that time, Dellner had about 500 employees worldwide.

In 2019, Dellner Invest sold the Dellner Couplers Group including all international subsidiaries and Dellner Dampers to the private equity firm EQT. In early 2021, Dellner acquired the couplers business of CAF MiiRA, a subsidiary of the Spanish train and bus producer Construcciones y Auxiliar de Ferrocarriles.

During the 2010s, Deller has grown steadily: the company claims to employ 1,200 people in 2021 and has 22 branches worldwide. Dellner Couplers has production facilities in India, Poland, Sweden, the UK and the USA.

Railway coupling
Dellner manufactures couplers connecting vehicle, pneumatics and electronics at the same time. The patented D-REX system provides Ethernet high speed data connection at speeds of 100 Mbit/s.

Dellner is part of the European Union's Shift2Rail initiative, which promotes the digitalisation and automation of rail freight transport in Europe.

References

External links 

 

Manufacturing companies of Sweden
Manufacturing companies established in 1941
Swedish companies established in 1941
Companies based in Dalarna County